Louis Rogé, known professionally as Brodinski, is a French composer, producer and DJ from Reims.

Biography

2007–2011 
He started to listen to music while he was still in high school and got passionate about the art of DJ. His main models were Damian Lazarus, Ivan Smagghe, 2 Many DJ's, and Andrew Weatherall. In Reims, his hometown, Brodinski got to know the ones who formed the local electronic scene among Yuksek. Alongside the latter, he produced his first single, "Bad Runner", signed in the wake of the renowned Swiss label Mental Groove. A signature which allowed Brodinski to sharpen his profile and attract attention. He made his first scenes as a DJ and got the opportunity to publish a series of remixes by popular artists, from Klaxons or Bonde do Rolê.

At the end of 2007, Brodinski took part in the great Soulwax Mas party organised in Ghent, like every year at Christmas, by the group Soulwax, alongside other artists such as Boyz Noize, Crookers or Tiga.

It's on the latter's label, turbo, that Brodinski released the EP Oblivion afterwards. Very quickly, the organisers of the London techno party "Bugged Out" asked him to produce a compilation called Suck My Deck. He then became a resident of the Panik festivals at the Élysée Montmartre, in Paris, and embarked on his first scene as a DJ, from Belgium to England to Los Angeles, sharing the bill with artists such as Erol Alkan.

At the end of the 2000s, he became the principal resident of the Social Club, on Montmartre road and established himself as the figurehead of a multi-facet generation, easily swinging from one genre to another, between rap and techno.

At the same time, the DJ was involved in several projects. Associated with DJ Orgasmic, he put together the Best of Everything compilation which combines precisely rap and techno. Alongside half of the duo The Shoes, Guillaume Brière, he formed the ephemeral duo Gucci Vump.

A touch of everything in perpetual motion, Brodinski is a DJ who counts, regularly called by festivals around the world. We can find him in Melbourne for the Parklife, in London on the side of Lovebox, or even at the Sonar in Barcelona where he is regularly invited.

It was during one of his many tours that Brodinski met DJ Mehdi and found in him a true mentor. Still at the Social Club, DJ Mehdi and Brodinski regularly hosted an evening called "McFly Tuesday".

2012–2016 
Very affected by the sudden death of DJ Mehdi in September 2011, Brodinski decided to take a new step in his career and launched the Bromance label, in collaboration with Manu Barron and Guillaume Berg, of which he is both the producer and artistic director. Bromance embodies the spirit of Brodinski, his taste for discovery without worrying about categories, the importance of human connections and an instinctive functioning guided by encounters.

From the end of 2011, the label regularly signed new artists who formed the avant-garde of Parisian electronic music, including Gesaffelstein, Club Cheval and Louisahhh. Bromance then developed across the Atlantic and participated in the emergence of international artists. The label's catalog thus included the presence of Detroit rapper Danny Brown or even Canadian producers Kaytranada and Illangelo.
 
In 2013, Kanye West called on Brodinski and Gesaffelstein to assist in the recording of his new album, Yeezus. The two Bromance artists co-produced two tracks on the record, "Black Skinhead" and "Send It Up". At the same time, Brodinski developed his collaborations across borders.
In the studio, he met the New York rapper Theophilus London or the standard bearer of Washington rap Shy Glizzy.

His collaborations, but also his travels to the United States first, inspired Brodinski to work on a first album: Brava. Released in early 2015, this album marked Brodinski's interest in the city of Atlanta and its rap culture. It notably contains collaborations with Bloody Jay, Young Scooter and Peewee Longway.

His music video "Can't help myself" was the overall winner of Berlin Music Video Awards 2015, while its directors, MEGAFORCE, won the award for the "Best Director" category.

After the release of his first album, Brodinski hired young French producers such as Ikaz Boi, 8tm, and Myth Sizer under the Bromance banner, and associated them with American artists. The end of 2016 and the start of 2017 were marked by two releases, the Young Slime Season and Sour Patch Kid projects, which put Brodinski a little more on the Atlanta scene. We thus note on the second disc the presence of 21 Savage.

2016–2018 
Brodinski puts an end to the adventure of his label Bromance and decided to divide his time between Paris and Atlanta. He met many artists and released several projects such as the EP "Brain Disorder", "The Matrix" in collaboration with rapper Hoodrich Pablo Juan, or "The Graduation" the first EP of Lil Reek, a rapper he discovered in Atlanta and took under his wing. Brodinski embarked on a new club tour towards the North American continent.

2018–2020 
Consolidating his establishment in Atlanta, he continued to collaborate with a series of young artists who, for him, embodied the future. For Brodinski, it is about highlighting new artists and shaping their sound through his productions.

In 2019, Brodinski produced new tracks for rappers 645AR, Reddo, Hell Kell or Ola Playa. He then released the project "Evil World" on the New York label Cinematic. He took the opportunity to invite a cohort of rappers from all over America, including Xanman, NgeeYL and Doe Boy. With thick and saturated melodies, which could be "Perfect for a Halloween after party", according to the magazine The Fader, Evil World translates Brodinski's inspiration. At the same time, Brodinski continued to tour clubs throughout Europe.

Discography

Albums 
 2015: Brava
 2019: Evil World

Mixtape 
 2016 : The Sour Patch Kid

Singles/EP

As Brodinski 
 2007 : Bad Runner EP
 2008 : Oblivion EP
 2009 : Eurostarr (with Mumdance)
 2009 : Peanuts Club (avec Noob)
 2010 : Arnold Classics
 2011 : Let the Beat Control Your Body (featuring Louisahhh!!!)
 2011 : Manifesto
 2012 : Nobody Rules the Streets (featuring Louisahhh!!!)
 2012 : Bromance #7
 2012 : One Night Stand (remix avec Canblaster)
 2013 : Late Night Alternative (Mixtape)
 2013 : The Purple Ride (Mixtape)
 2013 : Gimme Back the Night (featuring Theophilus London)
 2019 : Gang (featuring Doe Boy)

Remixes 
 Klaxons – It's Not Over Yet (Brodinski Remix) [Bugged Out]
 Adam Sky – Ape-X (Brodinski Remix) [White]
 Radioclit – Divine Gosa (Brodinski Remix) [Counterfeet]
 Das Pop – Fool For Love (Brodinski Remix) [NEWS]
 Klaxons – Atlantis to Interzone (Yuksek & Brodinski Remix)
 Bonde do Role – Office Boy (Brodinski Remix) [Domino]
 The Teenagers – Homecoming (Yuksek & Brodinski Remix)
 Alphabeat – 10,000 Nights (Brodinski & Yuksek Remix) [EMI]
 Bitchee Bitchee Ya Ya – Fuck Friend (Yuksek & Brodinski Remix) [Kitsuné]
 D.I.M. – Is You (Brodinski Remix) [Boysnoize Records]
 Heartsrevolution – CYOA (Brodinski Remix) [Iheartcomix]
 Tiga & Zyntherius – Sunglasses at Night (Yuksek & Brodinski Remix) [Turbo]
 The Subs – Papillon (Yuksek & Brodinski Remix) [Lektroluv]
 Jokers of the Scene – Acidrod (Brodinski Remix) [Fool's Gold]
 DJ Mehdi – Pocket Piano (Brodinski Remix) [Ed Banger]
 The Shoes – America (Brodinski Remix) [GUM]
 Buraka Som Sistema – Aqui Para Voces (Brodinski Remix) [Enchufada]
 Radioclit – Secousse (Brodinski Remix) [Mental Groove]
 Mixhell – Highly Explicit (Brodinski Remix) [Boysnoize Records]
 Peaches – Lose You (Brodinski & Yuksek Remix) [XL]
 Deepgroove – Annihilate (Brodinski Remix) [Underwater]
 Edu K – Flutesnoot (Brodinski Remix) [Man Recordings]
 Tony Senghore – If You Came Here (Brodinski Remix) [Horehaus]
 Monomaniax – Sexy Turismo (Brodinski Remix) [Black Frog]
 Crookers – Transilvania (Brodinski Remix) [Southern Fried]
 Tiga – Overtime (Brodinski Remix) [Turbo]
 The Aikiu – Red Kiss (Brodinski Remix) [Savoir Faire]
 Nero – Crush On You (Brodinski Remix) [MTA Records]
 Yuksek – Off The Wall (Brodinski Remix) [Savoir Faire]
 Beni – Last Night (Brodinski Remix) [Modular]
 Theophilus London – Last Name London (Brodinski Remix) [Reprise Records]
 Justice – On & On (Brodinski Remix) [Ed Banger]
 Surkin – Lose Yourself (Brodinski Remix) [Marble]
 Scissor Sisters – Only The Horses (Brodinski Remix) [Polydor]
 Gesaffelstein – Viol (Brodinski Remix) [Turbo]
 Danny Brown – Die Like a Rockstar (Brodinski Remix) [Fool's Gold]
 Sébastien Tellier – Cochon Ville (Brodinski Remix) [Record Makers]
 Miike Snow – The Wave (Brodinski Remix) [UMG]
 Far East Movement – Dirty Bass (Brodinski Remix) [Interscope]
 Skrillex & Damian Marley – Make It Bun Dem (Brodinski Remix) [OWSLA]
 Symphony Hall – One Night Stand (Brodinski & Canblaster Remix) [Marble]
 Woodkid – I Love You (Brodinski Remix) [GUM]
 Laurent Garnier – Jacques in the Box (Brodinski & Gesaffelstein Dirty Sprite Remix) [Ed Banger]
 Destructo – Higher (Brodinski Remix)
 I am who I am – Y (Brodinski Remix)
 King L – Val Venis (Brodinski Remix)
 Mai Lan – Les Huîtres (Brodinski Remix)
 Empire of the Sun - DNA (Brodinski Remix)

As G. Vump (with Guillaume Brière of The Shoes) 
2009
 Sha! Shtil! EP

2010 
Shakira – Loca (Production et G. Vump Remix)

2011 Mixtape Nvthin Bvt A Gvxxi Thang
 Bart B More – Romane (G. Vump Remix)
 Supra1 – Still Believe (G. Vump Remix)
 Matt & Kim – Cameras (G. Vump Remix)
 Woodkid – Iron (G.Vump Remix)
 Art Nouveau – Air France (G. Vump Remix)
 Yuksek – On a Train (G. Vump Remix)
 Lana Del Rey – Born to Die (G.Vump Remix)
 Switch – I Still Love You (G. Vump Remix)
 Arnaud Rebotini – Another Time, Another Place (G. Vump Remix)

2012 
 Birdy Nam Nam – Written in the Sand (G.Vump Remix)
 Jon Convex – Fade (G. Vump Remix)
 Cashmere Cat – Mirror Marru (G. Vump Remix)

2013
 Mangane – G. Vump (dans la mixtape de Brodinski 'Late Night Alternative')
 Joke – Louis XIV (Production par G. Vump)

As The Krays 
 2010 : We Are Ready When You Are

References

External links 
 
 

French DJs
Living people
French electronic musicians
Musicians from Reims
Electronic dance music DJs
1987 births